Legal ethics are principles of conduct that members of the legal profession are expected to observe in their practice. They are an outgrowth of the development of the legal profession itself.

In the United States
In the U.S., each state or territory has a code of professional conduct dictating rules of ethics. These may be adopted by the respective state legislatures and/or judicial systems. The American Bar Association has promulgated the Model Rules of Professional Conduct which, while formally only a recommendation by a private body, have been influential in many jurisdictions.  The Model Rules address many topics which are found in state ethics rules, including the client-lawyer relationship, duties of a lawyer as advocate in adversary proceedings, dealings with persons other than clients, law firms and associations, public service, advertising, and maintaining the integrity of the profession.  Respect of client confidences, candor toward the tribunal, truthfulness in statements to others, and professional independence are some of the defining features of legal ethics.

The Multistate Professional Responsibility Examination (MPRE) is used to measure examinees' knowledge and understanding of established standards related to the professional conduct of lawyers. The MPRE is a prerequisite or corequisite to the bar examination for admission as an attorney at law in 48 of the 50 states of the United States, as well as the District of Columbia, Guam, the Northern Mariana Islands, the U.S. Virgin Islands, and the Republic of Palau. Of the 56 jurisdictions within the United States, only Maryland, Puerto Rico, and Wisconsin do not use the MPRE; however, these jurisdictions still incorporate local ethics rules in their respective bar examinations.

Maynard Pirsig, published one of the first course books on legal ethics, Cases and Materials on Legal Ethics, 1949. Maynard Pirsig also published the definition of Legal Ethics, in Encyclopedia Britannica, 1974.

Some U.S. states, including New York, require applicants seeking to become attorneys to have taken a course in professional responsibility during law school.

Enforcement

United States
Every state in the United States has a regulatory body (usually called a state bar association) that polices lawyer conduct. When lawyers are licensed to practice in a state, those lawyers subject themselves to this authority.  Overall responsibility often lies with the highest court in a state (such as state supreme court).  The state bar associations, often in consultation with the court,  adopt a set of rules that set forth the applicable ethical duties.  As of 2013, 48 states have adopted a version of the American Bar Association's model rules. California is the only state that has not adopted either—instead these states have written their own rules from scratch.

There was once some debate over whether state ethical rules apply to federal prosecutors. The Department of Justice has held differing opinions through different administrations, with the Thornburgh Memo suggesting these rules do not apply, and the Reno Rules asserting that they do apply. Now,  28 U.S.C. § 530B provides that government attorneys are subject to the state ethics laws in the state in which they practice.

Lawyers who fail to comply with local rules of ethics may be subjected to discipline ranging from private (non-public) reprimand to disbarment.

India
In India, under the Advocates Act of 1961, the Bar Council of India is responsible for creating rules for registering advocates, regulation of legal ethics, and for administering disciplinary action.
In India a legal law firm named Legalethics, (https://www.legalethics.in) which provides legal awareness for people who need it because of innocence.

Australia
In New South Wales, reforms commencing from July 1, 2015 brought a uniform regulatory system to the legal profession regarding billing arrangements, discipline procedures and complaints handling processing. An inter jurisdictional Legal Services Council was established in order to regulate the legal profession and its delivery of legal services. This resulted in the creation of the Legal Profession Uniform Law Australian Solicitors’ Conduct Rules 2015 and the Legal Profession Uniform Conduct Barristers' Rules 2015.

The States and Territories of Australia are regulated through co-regulation, self-regulation and independent regulation. 
 New South Wales is co-regulated by the Law Society of NSW, the NSW Bar Association and the Legal Services Commissioner. 
 Queensland is co-regulated by the Law Society of Queensland, Bar Association of Queensland and the Legal Services Commissioner.
 Tasmania is self-regulated through the Law Society of Tasmania. 
 Victoria is co-regulated in collaboration with the Victorian Legal Services Board and Commissioner, the Law Institute of Victoria and the Victorian Bar 
 South Australia is independently regulated by the Legal Practitioners Conduct Board. 
 Western Australia is independently regulated through the Legal Practice Board and the Legal Profession Complaints Committee.
 The Northern Territory is self-regulated by the Law Society of the Northern Territory.
 The Australian Capital Territory is self-regulated by the Law Society of the ACT, the ACT Bar Association and the Complaints Investigating Committee.

References
 
 No Contest: Corporate Lawyers and the Perversion of Justice in America, by Ralph Nader and Wesley J. Smith. 
 California Rules of Professional Conduct, published by the Office of Professional Competence, Planning & Development of the State Bar of California.
 Gabriel Chin & Scott Wells, Can a Reasonable Doubt have an Unreasonable Price? Limitations on Attorney's Fees in Criminal Cases, 41 Boston College Law Review 1 (1999)

External links
 State Bar of California Professional Responsibility (Legal Ethics)
 The California State Bar Discipline System - How It Works
 New York Rules of Professional Conduct 
 LII Law about... Professional Responsibility (Legal Ethics)
 The Association of Professional Responsibility Lawyers (APRL)
 The Legal Information Institute at Cornell University (U.S.)
 Canadian Bar Association Code of Conduct
 2013 Legal Ethics Year in Review  - Article series covering ways to improve the ethical and operational health of law firms.